Anton Kovalyov (born 4 March 1992) is a Ukrainian-born Canadian (formerly representing Argentina) chess grandmaster.

Chess career
In 2004, he finished equal first at the Pan American Under-12 Championship and thanks to this result he was awarded the title of FIDE Master.

In 2008 Kovalyov played for the Argentine team at the 38th Chess Olympiad. At the FIDE congress held during the competition he was awarded the grandmaster title.

In 2009 he won the Quebec Invitational Championship in Quebec, Canada. He won the Quebec Junior Championship in 2010, 2011 and 2012.

He switched to the Canadian Chess Federation in 2013. In August 2014, he played for Canada on the top board at the 41st Chess Olympiad. He scored 7/11 (+4–1=6) for a performance rating of 2670.

At the 2015 American Continental Chess Championship he scored 8 points out of 11 finishing in a tie for third with other five players, with whom he played a rapid playoff and managed to earn a spot in the Chess World Cup 2015. In the latter he knocked out Rustam Kasimdzhanov and Sandro Mareco in round one and two respectively, then he was eliminated by Fabiano Caruana in the third round.

In May 2016, he came in tied for second in the American Continental Chess Championship, qualifying for a place in the Chess World Cup 2017.

In September 2016, he competed for Canada on board 2 at the 42nd Chess Olympiad. He scored 8/10 (+6–0=4) for a performance rating of 2852. This was the second best board 2 performance, behind only Vladimir Kramnik's 2903 performance for Russia.

In the Chess World Cup 2017, he defeated Varuzhan Akobian in the first round and former World Champion Viswanathan Anand in the second, and was due to face Maxim Rodshtein in the third. Shortly before the game with Rodshtein was due to start, Zurab Azmaiparashvili, dressed in blue jeans, told Kovalyov to change from shorts to long pants.  The two exchanged words, and Kovalyov ended up leaving the venue forfeiting the game. Kovalyov had been wearing shorts to FIDE events for years, but no one had said anything to him before about it. Kovalyov said part of his anger came from Azmaiparashvili shouting that he was dressed like a 'gypsy,' a word that struck Kovalyov as a racial slur.

Personal life
Born in Kharkiv, Ukraine, Kovalyov moved to Argentina in 2000, where he learned how to play chess under the guidance of Pablo Ricardi and Oscar Panno. In 2007 he moved to Montreal, Quebec, Canada, with his family. As of 2017, he is pursuing a master's degree in Computer Science at the University of Texas at Dallas.

References

External links
Anton Kovalyov chess games at 365Chess.com

1992 births
Living people
Sportspeople from Kharkiv
Argentine chess players
Argentine emigrants to Canada
Canadian chess players
Chess grandmasters
Chess Olympiad competitors
Ukrainian emigrants to Argentina
Ukrainian people of Russian descent